Snellenia coccinea is a species of moth of the Stathmopodidae family. It was described by Walsingham in 1889. It is found in the Himalaya.

References

Moths described in 1889
Stathmopodidae